Antonio Giménez-Rico Sáenz de Cabezón (20 November 1938 – 12 February 2021) was a Spanish film director and screenwriter.

Career
Antonio Giménez-Rico obtained a law degree from the University of Valladolid.<ref name = "Torres 231">Torres,  Diccionario del cine Español,  p. 231</ref> He also studied journalism and piano and worked on radio. He directed the film club at the university of Burgos and went to write movie criticism for the film magazine, Cinestudio. He began his apprenticeship in film productions in 1963, working as an assistant director in films directed by Vittorio Cottafavi and Eugenio Martín, among others. In 1966 he made his debut as a director with the children's film, Mañana de Domingo, (Sunday Morning),  which was followed by a number of comedies like El Hueso (1968) and El Cronicón (1969). The failure of ¿Es usted mi padre? (Are you my father ?) (1970), led him to find employment on television.
 
In 1970, Giménez-Rico began working extensively in state television for a period of years during which he directed the crime TV series Plinio (1972), about the character created by the writer Francisco García Pavón.  He returned to motion pictures in 1976 with Retrato de Familia, (Family Portrait), an adaptation of Miguel Delibes novel, Mi idolatrado hijo Sisi, (My Beloved Son Sisi) dealing with members of a provincial family during the civil war, the film is widely considered as Giménez-Rico's best work. It enabled him to make  Al fin solos pero...  (At last alone, but... 1977), which critics and audiences found disappointing. The little success he achieved with his next film Del Amor y de la muerte (1977)  made him come back to work on television. He later made the highly acclaimed documentary film Vestida de Azul (Dressed in Blue) (1983), which combines a series of interviews with transsexuals with dramatized fictional scenes.

On television Giménez-Rico directed the series Pagina de Sucesos (1985). This was followed two years later by El disputado voto del señor Cayo (The disputed Vote for Mr Cayo) (1986), which dealt with life in a Castillian village during the post Franco election of 1977, and another film adapted from a novel by Miguel Delibes. His following films failed to achieve critical or commercial success like his 1987 film Jarrapellejos, which was entered into the 38th Berlin International Film Festival.
  
Gimenez-Rico continued to work in films. He made the anti militaristic comedy Soldadito Español (Spanish Soldier boy) (1988), co scripted with Rafael Azcona, Cuatro Estaciones;(Four Seasons) (1991) and Tres Palabras (Three Words) (1993). These films failed to impress critics or audiences. In 1999 he was a member of the jury at the 21st Moscow International Film Festival.

His last project was a historical drama set in the city of Burgos during the Spanish Civil War. It's based on Óscar Esquivias' novel Inquietud en el  Paraíso (2005) [Restlessness in Paradise].

Death
Giménez-Rico died from COVID-19 on 12 February 2021, at the age of 82.

Filmography
 El hueso (1967)
 El cronicón (1970)
 ¿Es usted mi padre? (1971)
 Retrato de Familia (1976), (based on the novel Mi idolatrado hijo Sisí by Miguel Delibes)
 Al fin solos, pero... (1977)
 Vestida de azul (1984)
 El disputado voto del Sr. Cayo (1986)
 Jarrapellejos (1987), (based on a novel by Felipe Trigo)
 Soldadito español (1988) Catorce estaciones (1990)
 Tres palabras (1993)
 Sombras y luces: Cien años de cine español (1996), (documentary)
 Las ratas (1998), (based on a novel by Miguel Delibes)
 Primer y último amor (2002), (based on a novel by Torcuato Luca de Tena)
 Hotel Danubio (2003), (remake of Los peces rojos, by José Antonio Nieves Conde, 1955)
 El libro de las aguas (2008), (based on a novel by Alejandro López Andrada)

References

 Bibliography 
 D'Lugo, Marvin: Guide to the Cinema of Spain, Greenwood Press, 1997. 
 Torres, Augusto, Diccionario del cine Espanol'', Espasa Calpe, 1996,

External links
 

1938 births
2021 deaths
Deaths from the COVID-19 pandemic in Spain
People from Burgos
Spanish film directors